University of New England may refer to:

 University of New England (Australia), in New South Wales, with about 18,000 students
 University of New England (United States), in Biddeford, Maine, with about 3,000 students

See also
New England College in New Hampshire, United States